The Mvog-Betsi Zoo is a botanical and zoological park located in Yaoundé, Cameroon. It is administered by the country's Ministry of Forestry and Fauna (MINFOF) (formerly the Ministry of Environments and Forests (MINEF)), and there is a wide range of species at the zoo, including big cats, reptiles, and birds of prey. Ape Action Africa has taken responsibility for the care of the primates at the zoo.

Fauna

 Agile mangabey
 Baboon
 De Brazza's monkey
 Drill
 Grey-cheeked mangabey
 Mandrill
 Tantalus monkey
 Patas monkey
 Putty-nosed monkey
 Red-capped mangabey
 Lion

See also
 Mefou National Park

References

Buildings and structures in Yaoundé
Nature conservation in Cameroon
Tourist attractions in Cameroon
Zoos in Cameroon